Steven Vincent Leigh (born 10 August 1964) is an actor and martial artist. He had a recurring role as Wei-Lee Young in the NBC soap opera Sunset Beach. In 1987 he appeared in the film In Love and War.

External links

1964 births
Living people
American male soap opera actors
Place of birth missing (living people)
20th-century American male actors